The 2003 Grand Prix Americas was the eighth race of the 2003 American Le Mans Series season.  It took place on a temporary street circuit in Miami, Florida on September 27, 2003.

The race was scheduled for 2 hours and 45 minutes, but was ended several minutes early due to heavy rains causing multiple accidents.

Official results
Class winners in bold.  Cars failing to complete 75% of winner's distance marked as Not Classified (NC).

Statistics
 Pole Position - #38 ADT Champion Racing - 0:47.848
 Fastest Lap - #38 ADT Champion Racing - 0:49.260
 Distance - 290.567 km
 Average Speed - 107.544 km/h

External links
  
 Race Results

A
Grand Prix Americas